Abney (Old English Abba's Island) is a village in the English county of Derbyshire. The settlement was mentioned as Habenai in the Domesday book of 1086. It was recorded as Abbeneia, Abbeney(a) and Abbeneye between 1200 and 1431, and as Abney from 1416.

The village is too small to have its own amenities. The closest church, pub and shops are to be found in Eyam. The village was in the civil parish of Outseats, but in April 2015 the Outseats parish was merged with Hathersage parish, the latter name being used for the two combined parishes.

Notable residents
William Newton, poet, was born near Abney at Cockey Farm.

References

External links 
 www.peakdistrictinformation.com/towns/abney.php
 
 

Villages in Derbyshire
Towns and villages of the Peak District
Derbyshire Dales